John Chew (13 May 1920 – 21 October 2002) was a footballer who played for Burnley, Bradford City and Darwen. He made more than 200 league appearances for Burnley side, scoring more than 40 goals. He played just one season with Bradford City, scoring four goals from 36 games. Chew was dubbed to have the hardest shot in league football and had one of the most feared left foots ever. He was born in Blackburn.

References

1920 births
2002 deaths
Footballers from Blackburn
English Football League players
Burnley F.C. players
Bradford City A.F.C. players
Darwen F.C. players
English footballers
Association football wingers
FA Cup Final players